Murtaza Jafri (born 7 March 1958) is a Pakistani painter, draftsman, sculptor and art-educator. He is also principal/Vice Chancellor of National College of Arts, Lahore, a post he has been holding since August 2013. Jafri has been teaching art since 1987 and has taught at National College of Arts, he has also supervised PhD candidates in leading universities of Pakistan and abroad. Jafri has also served as director at Pakistan National Council of the Arts, Islamabad from 1989 to 1990. Jafri also has studied in various universities, including National College of Arts (Pakistan), Chelsea College of Arts (England), University of Brighton (England) Concordia University (Canada), Université de Montréal (Canada) and Algonquin College (Canada). Jafri has a PhD in Fine Art, Bachelor of Fine Arts and a Master of Arts degree.

References 
 http://www.dailymotion.com/video/x1ghhax_prof-dr-murtaza-jafri-principal-national-college-of-art-talking-with-shakeel-anjum-jeeveypakistan-co_news
 http://www.nation.com.pk/lahore/28-Aug-2013/nca-gets-head-after-three-years
 http://theiranproject.com/blog/tag/nca-principal-dr-murtaza-jafri/
 http://tribune.com.pk/story/597132/about-time-jafri-looks-to-resolve-problems-at-nca/
 http://socialdevfoundation.org/site/about-us/advisory-board/dr-murtaza-jafri/

20th-century Pakistani painters
1958 births
Alumni of the University of East London
Alumni of the University of the Arts London
Living people
National College of Arts alumni
Pakistani sculptors